Sameer Dattatraya Meghe (born 12 February 1978) is a member of the 13th Maharashtra Legislative Assembly. He is a member of the Bharatiya Janata Party (BJP) and represents the Hingna constituency.

Sameer Meghe is son of former Indian National Congress MP, Datta Meghe. Sameer Meghe resigned from the Indian National Congress in June 2014, along with his father and brother Sagar Meghe, and joined the Bharatiya Janata Party. Meghe was president of Nagpur District Indian Youth Congress.

Early life
Sameer Meghe was born to Shalinitai and Dattaji Meghe, a four time MP.

Professional life
 Secretary 
Datta Meghe Institute of Engineering Technology and Research.
 Treasurer
Nagar Yuwak Shikshan Sanstha
 Secretary
Datta Meghe Institute of Medical Sciences
 Chairman
Barrister Sheshrao Wankhede Cooperative Spinning Mill, Butibori
 Managing Director
Raghav Associates, Nagpur

Education and early career
Sameer Meghe holds a Bachelor of Commerce Degree.

Family and personal life
Sameer Meghe is married to Vrinda Meghe and they have son Raghav & daughter Ridhima.

Political career
In 2011, elected president of Youth Congress from Nagpur Lok Sabha constituency polling almost 750 votes.

In 2014, elected as MLA of Maharashtra from Hingna by 23,158 Votes from NCP leader & former Cabinet Minister who is candidate Rameshchandra Gopikisan Bang.

Positions held

Within BJP

MLA from Hingna Legislative Assembly

References

Maharashtra MLAs 2014–2019
Politicians from Nagpur
Living people
People from Wardha district
1978 births
Marathi politicians
Bharatiya Janata Party politicians from Maharashtra
Maharashtra MLAs 2019–2024